Myrna Goossen was born on October 29, 1962 in Hilversum. She is a Dutch celebrity and a television presenter, who has been associated with AVRO since 1985.

References

External links 
 

1962 births
Living people
Dutch television presenters
Dutch women television presenters
People from Hilversum
20th-century Dutch women
21st-century Dutch women